The Daihatsu Sigra is a mini MPV with standard three-row seating designed by Daihatsu and manufactured by Astra Daihatsu Motor in Indonesia since July 2016 to be sold exclusively in the country. Developed by Daihatsu chief engineer Nobuhiko Ono, it is built on lengthened Ayla's platform and positioned below the Xenia as a more affordable MPV option for the Indonesian market, where three-row MPVs have high demand in the country. It is also rebadged and sold by Toyota as the Toyota Calya with a differentiated front fascia. The cars were built to meet the "Low Cost Green Car" regulation by the Indonesian government that abolished luxury goods tax for economical cars.

The Sigra was previewed by UFC, UFC2 and UFC 3 concept cars that was shown in 2012, 2013 and 2014 respectively. The production model was unveiled on 2 August 2016 alongside the Calya and launched at the 24th Gaikindo Indonesia International Auto Show on 11 August 2016. Both cars are manufactured at the Karawang plant, with a claimed localisation level of 94%.

The name Sigra was taken from the Sanskrit word meaning 'quick response', while Calya means 'perfection'.



Engines

Grade levels

Facelift 
The Sigra received its facelift on 16 September 2019, along with the Calya. The facelift consisted of redesigned front fascia, longer rear number plate garnish and usage of LED headlights (except for Sigra 1.0 D). In the interior, a storage space below the gear lever was also added. Both cars received another minor update on 7 July 2022.

Gallery

Sigra

Calya

Safety

Sales

References

External links 

  (Sigra)
  (Calya)

Sigra
Cars introduced in 2016
2020s cars
Mini MPVs
Front-wheel-drive vehicles